An election to the Carmarthenshire County Council was held in March 1928. It was preceded by the 1925 election and followed by the 1931 election.

Overview of the result

The election saw the disappearance of the Conservative and Liberal parties from county elections in Carmarthenshire, and contests would henceforth be between Labour and the Independents. Labour did not make significant progress in 1928 and it was claimed that the party lacked the resources to make a significant challenge.

Boundary changes

There were no boundary changes.

Unopposed returns

Only 18 of the 53 divisions were contested, the same number as in 1925.

Contested elections

Most of the contested elections were in the eastern part of the counties. Elsewhere, there were some contests where Independent candidates faced each other. Two such contests at Llanybydder and Rhydcymerau saw two Independents who were also brothers lose their seats.

Retiring aldermen

The aldermen who retired at the election were

Summary of results

This section summarises the detailed results which are noted in the following sections. As noted, there was ambiguity in some cases over the party affiliation.

This table summarises the result of the elections in all wards. A total of 53 councillors were elected.

|}

|}

|}

Ward results

Abergwili

Ammanford

Bettws

Caio

Carmarthen Eastern Ward (Lower Division)

Carmarthen Eastern Ward (Upper Division)

Carmarthen Western Ward (Lower Division)

Carmarthen Western Ward (Upper Division)

Cenarth

Cilycwm

Conwil

Kidwelly

Laugharne

Llanarthney

Llanboidy

Llandebie

Llandilo Rural

Llandilo Urban

Llandovery

Llandyssilio

Llanedy

Llanegwad

Llanelly Division.1

Llanelly Division 2

Llanelly Division 3

Llanelly Division 4

Llanelly Division 5

Llanelly Division 7

Llanelly Division 7

Llanelly Division 8

Llanelly Rural, Berwick

Llanelly Rural, Hengoed

Llanelly Rural, Westfa and Glyn

Llanfihangel Aberbythick

Llanfihangel-ar-Arth

Llangadock

Llangeler

Llangendeirne

Llangennech

Llangunnor

Llanon

Llansawel

Llanstephan

Llanybyther

Mothvey

Pembrey North

Pembrey South

Quarter Bach

Rhydcymmerai

St Clears

St Ishmael

Trelech

Whitland

Election of aldermen

In addition to the 53 councillors, the council consisted of 17 county aldermen. Aldermen were elected by the council, and served a six-year term. Following the elections, the following eight aldermen were elected (with the number of votes in each case):

Thomas Morris
Thomas Thomas
W.J. Williams
Sir Dudley Drummond
Ben Evans
John Lewis
H.E. Blagdon-Richards
L.N. Powell

On behalf of the eastern members of the Council, Labour member D.B. Lewis of Llandybie protested against the re-election of aldermen who had not faced the electorate. However, he declared that on this occasion they had decided not to oppose the re-election of aldermen who had not been given advance notice. This was not the first time this matter had been raised by Labour councillors although it is ironic that one of the aldermen concerned, W.J. Williams of Brynamman was a Labour representative.

References

1928
1928 Welsh local elections